Ukraine competed at the 2001 Summer Universiade in Beijing, China, from 22 August to 1 September 2001. Ukrainian men's baketball team finished 13th, Ukrainian men's volleyball team finished 13th, Ukrainian women's volleyball team ranked 9th. Ukraine did not compete in water polo (and no information regarding tennis and table tennis).

Medal summary

Medal by sports

Medalists

See also
 Ukraine at the 2001 Winter Universiade

References

Nations at the 2001 Summer Universiade
2001 in Ukrainian sport
2001